Nationality words link to articles with information on the nation's poetry or literature (for instance, Irish or France).

Events

Works published

Great Britain
 Jane Brereton, An Expostulatory Epistle to Sir Richard Steele upon the Death of Mr. Addison, published anonymously
 Jonathan Burt, A Lamentation Occasion'd by the Great Sickness & Lamented Deaths of Divers Eminent Persons in Springfield, a jeremiad composed in hymnal meter, describing the benefits of living righteously and calling a recent deadly epidemic evidence of God's displeasure, English Colonial America
 Samuel Croxall, The Fair Circassian, verse adaptation of the Song of Songs
 John Gay, Poems on Several Occasions
 Anthony Hammond, A New Miscellany of Original Poems, Translations and Imitations, also known as Hammonds Miscellany, including work by Alexander Pope, Lady Mary Wortley Montagu, Bevil Higgons and Nicholas Amhurst, as well as letters by John Wilmot, the Earl of Rochester
 Aaron Hill, The Creation
 Giles Jacob, An Historical Account of the Lives and Writings of Our most Considerable English Poets, whether Epick, Lyrick, Elegaick, Eppigrammatists, Etc. (first volume, titled The Poetical Register; or, The Lives and Characters of the English Dramatick Poets, With an Account of their Writings published in 1719), biography and criticism; both volumes reissued in 1723
 Matthew Prior, Poems on Several Occasions, the book states "1718", but it was not ready for subscribers until March of this year (see also Poems on Several Occasions 1709)
 Alexander Pope, translator, Homer's Iliad Books V-VI, (preceded by Book I in 1715, Book II in 1716, Book III in 1717 and Book IV in 1718)
 Allan Ramsay, Poems
 George Sewell, A New Collection of Original Poems
 Edward Ward, The Delights of the Bottle; or, The Compleat Vintner

Other
 Ludvig Holberg, Peder Paars, a verse, mock-epic, Denmark

Births
Death years link to the corresponding "[year] in poetry" article:
 January; Charlotta Löfgren  (died 1784), Swedish poet
 October 3 – Johann Peter Uz, German poet (died 1796)
 December 14 – Justus Möser (died 1794), German jurist, social theorist and poet
 Francis Fawkes (died 1777), English poet and translator
 James Merrick (died 1769), English poet and scholar
 Jeanne-Catherine Van Goethem (died 1776) Flemish poet

Deaths
Birth years link to the corresponding "[year] in poetry" article:
 January 1 – Francis Daniel Pastorius (born 1651), English Colonial American Quaker settler, founder of Germantown, Pennsylvania and poet
 June 27 – Guillaume Amfrye de Chaulieu (born 1639), French poet and wit
 August 5 – Anne Finch (born 1661), countess of Winchilsea, English poet
 date unknown
 Abdul-Qādir Bēdil (born 1642), Persian poet and Sufi
 Shalom Shabazi (born 1619), Jewish poet of Yemen

See also

Poetry
List of years in poetry
List of years in literature
 18th century in poetry
 18th century in literature
 Augustan poetry
 Scriblerus Club

Notes

 "A Timeline of English Poetry" Web page of the Representative Poetry Online Web site, University of Toronto

18th-century poetry
Poetry